Kotka Piran is a village in Khyber-Pakhtunkhwa province of Pakistan. It is located at 32°58'42N 70°34'53E with an altitude of 364 metres (1197 feet).

References

Villages in Khyber Pakhtunkhwa